In South Africa, District Management Area (DMA) was the name given to areas within a district municipality that did not fall within any local municipality, and received municipal services directly from the district. Since the 2011 elections all of mainland South Africa has been covered by local (or metropolitan) municipalities, and there are therefore no DMAs.

The DMAs were primarily national parks and nature reserves, or in western parts of South Africa are isolated areas of very low population density.

The table shows the 2007 census population of the DMAs.

See also 

 Metropolitan municipality (South Africa)
 District municipality (South Africa)
 Local municipality (South Africa)

References 

District Municipalities of South Africa